Ruben Sargsyan, also seen as Sarkisyan (November 22, 1945 – April 6, 2013), was an Armenian composer, laureate of the State Award of Armenia, professor of the Yerevan Komitas State Conservatory.

Biography
Ruben Sargsyan was born in Yerevan, Armenia, in the family of scientist agronome Suren Sargsyan. He first began to study at the Sayat-Nova Music School, then continued his education at the Romanos Melikian Music College. At the second year of college education he has been recommended and transferred to the music composition class of the Yerevan Komitas State Conservatory, where he studied with professor Ghazaros Saryan. He graduated from the Conservatory in 1972 and became a member of the Composers' Union. In 1973-1985 Ruben Sargsyan has been teaching Music Theory and Solfege at the Yerevan Music School No.10. In 1987-2013 he has taught Music Composition and Modern Composition Technology at the Yerevan Komitas State Conservatory. In 2004 became a Professor of Music.
In 1994 Ruben Sargsyan, along with other modern Armenian composers and musicologists, established the Armenian Musical Assembly, non-governmental, non-for-profit organization, intended to promote and support modern Armenian Music worldwide.

Awards
 2007 - received the State Award of Armenia for his orchestral cycle My coeval.
 1993 - became a laureate of the national competition The Best Symphonic Composition for his Symphonic Poem.
 1978 - received the Best Composition of the Year national award for his Cello Concerto No.1

Selected compositions
 Rock-ballet The Invisible Man, libretto based on Herbert Wells novel, 2000
 , 1986 (Komitas publishing, Yerevan, 2012)
 Symphony No.2, Ironica, for symphonic orchestra, 1989 (Komitas publishing, Yerevan, 2010)
 Symphony No.3, The Chronicle, for symphonic orchestra (published, Komitas publishing, Yerevan, 2005)
 Symphony In modo passacaglia for chamber orchestra, 1984
 Concerto No.1 for Violin and Chamber orchestra, 1983 (published, Sovetakan Grogh publishing, Yerevan, 1989)
 Concerto No.2 for Violin and Chamber orchestra, 1984 (published, Komitas publishing, Yerevan, 2009)
 Concerto No.3 for Violin and Chamber orchestra, 1989
 Concerto No.4 for Violin and Chamber orchestra, 2001 (published, Komitas publishing, Yerevan, 2003)
 Concerto No.1 for Cello and Symphonic orchestra, 1977
 Concerto No.2 for Cello and Chamber orchestra, 1979
 Concerto No.3 for Cello and Chamber orchestra, 1989
 Concerto No.4 for Cello and Chamber orchestra, 1994
 Concerto for Viola and Chamber orchestra, 1992
 (in memory of Gh. Saryan), 2000. (published, Komitas publishing, Yerevan, 2001)
 In memory for Chamber orchestra, celesta and percussion (in memory of Avet Terteryan), 1996 (published, Komitas publishing, Yerevan, 2001)
 Concertino for String orchestra, 1996 (published, Komitas publishing, Yerevan, 2001)
 Elegy for flute and string ensemble, 1998
 Junior concerto for piano and string orchestra, 1983
 String Quartet, 1982, Sovetakan Grogh publishing, 1983
 Trio for Violin, Cello and Piano, 1984, Komitas publishing, 2002
 Sonata for Flute and Piano, 2001
 , 1977, Soviet Composer publishing, 1980
 Sonata No.1 for Violin and Piano, 1976, Sovetakan Grogh publishingb, 1982
 , 1978, Soviet Composer publishing, 1984
 Piano sonata, 1980, Sovetakan Grogh publishingb, 1982
 Armenian graphics 5 pieces for piano solo, 1975, Sovetakan Grogh publishingb, 1982
 Cercio declamando for cello solo, 2001, Komitas publishing, 2006
 Nerses Shnorhali poem for flute, piano and reciter, 1975
 A gift to Komitas 7 pieces for piano solo, 1987, Komitas publishing, 2002
 Piano Sonatina No.1, 1968, Sovetakan Grogh publishing, 1985
 Piano Sonatina No.2, 1980
 Piano Sonatina No.3, 1981
 Piano Sonatina No.4, 1987, Komitas publishing, 2000
 Album for the Young for Piano solo, 1983, Komitas publishing, 2000
 Requiem for September for Chamber orchestra, dedicated to the victims of 9/11, 2003 
 My coeval cycle for Chamber orchestra (1. , 2. All that remains, 3. , 4. Mass for the ghost), 2005–2006, Komitas publishing, 2006, Amrots Group publishing, 2011
 Call the Spring for Flute, Glockenspiel and chamber ensemble, 2007-2009
 Mozart's will for flute, oboe, clarinet in B, fagot, trumpet in B, trombone, timpani and chamber ensemble, 2008 
 Black ball for flute, glockenspiel and chamber ensemble, 2007-2009
 , in memory of musicologist Irina Tigranova, 2011
 , 2011
 The death of the Legend for Piano solo, 2012
 String Quartet, in memory of composer Edvard Mirzoyan, 2012

References

 Feist, Thomas. “Glänzende Interpretation zejtgenössischer Musik. Armenisches Ensemble im Schauspielhaus gefeiert”. – “Neues Deutschland”. 25 Februar 1987.
 Rukhkyan, M.A. - Portraits of the Armenian composers - Nairi publishing house, Yerevan, 2009, pp. 154–198
 Berko, M. - Hard but happy ways of cognition - Soviet music publishing house, 1978, No.4, pp. 14–17
 Meyer, K. - Armenian musical culture - Armenia today, 1980, No.2, p. 33
 Korikhalova, N. P. - Visiting leningradians - The voice of Armenia, January 4, 1991

Links
 Ruben Sargsyan
 www.panarmenian.net/rus/culture/news/39564/
 www.armtown.com/news/ru/pan/20091123/39781/
 www.biografija.ru/show_bio.aspx?id=115278
 www.golos.am/index.php?option=com_content&task=view&id=10201&Itemid=53
 www.sobesednik.am/old_archive/index.php?option=com_content&view=article&id=36899:2010-03-08-11-54-28&catid=2593:n126&Itemid=14324

Armenian composers
20th-century classical composers
21st-century classical composers
1945 births
2013 deaths
Male classical composers
20th-century male musicians
21st-century male musicians